John Johnston was a politician in Queensland, Australia. He was a Member of the Queensland Legislative Assembly.

Electorate 
John Johnston represented the electoral district of Ipswich from 12 August 1870 to 9 October 1872.

Early life 
He was born in Dublin, Ireland in 1823.

Later life 
He was a miner in Victoria from 1853 to 1855 and then went on to establish a business in Ipswich, Queensland.
He was on the committee for the Hibernian Society.
John Johnston died while still in office on 9 October 1872.

References

Members of the Queensland Legislative Assembly
1823 births
1872 deaths
People from Queensland
19th-century Australian politicians
Irish emigrants to colonial Australia